Pararhyme is a half-rhyme in which there is vowel variation within the same consonant pattern.

"Strange Meeting" (1918) is a poem by Wilfred Owen, a war poet who used pararhyme in his writing. Here is a part of the poem that shows pararhyme:
Too fast in thought or death to be bestirred.
Then, as I probed them, one sprang up, and stared
With piteous recognition in fixed eyes,
Lifting distressful hands, as if to bless.
And by his smile, I knew that sullen hall,
By his dead smile I knew we stood in Hell.

Pararhyme features in the Welsh cynghanedd poetic forms. The following short poem by Robert Graves is a demonstration in English of the cynghanedd groes form, in which each consonant sound before the caesura is repeated in the same order after the caesura (Graves notes that the ss of 'across' and the s of 'crows' match visually but are not the same sound):
Billet spied,
Bolt sped.
Across field
Crows fled,
Aloft, wounded,
Left one dead.

Examples 
 hill/hell
 lover/liver
 live/love

References 

"pararhyme, n.". OED Online. March 2012. Oxford University Press.
Owen W. Strange Meeting. Columbia Granger's Poetry Database [serial online]. n.d.;Available from: Columbia Granger's Poetry Database, Ipswich, MA.
"Wilfred Owen." Encyclopedia of World Biography. 2nd ed. Vol. 20. Detroit: Gale, 2004. 291–293. Gale Virtual Reference Library. Web.

External links
http://www.wilfredowen.org.uk/home/

Rhyme